Ross Hassig (born December 13, 1945)  is an American historical anthropologist specializing in Mesoamerican studies, particularly the Aztec culture.  His focus is often on the description of practical infrastructure in Mesoamerican societies. He is the author of several influential books, among them: Time, History, and Belief in Aztec and Colonial Mexico; Aztec Warfare: Imperial Expansion and Political Control; and Trade, Tribute, and Transportation: The Sixteenth-Century Political Economy of the Valley of Mexico.

Career
Hassig began his academic career as an undergraduate at Vanderbilt University, where his studies initially focused on non-Western legal systems. He soon developed an interest in anthropology, later obtaining in 1974 his Master's degree from Vanderbilt in Law and Anthropology, with a thesis on political development among the Puebloan peoples at Acoma Pueblo. He then went on further his graduate studies at Stanford University, obtaining his Ph.D from the Department of Anthropology there in 1980.

During his time at Stanford, Hassig's research agenda shifted to focus on the cultures of Mesoamerica, where he investigated the economic and political foundations of pre- and post-conquest societies. Among the first of his studies was directed towards the underpinnings of the pre-Columbian Tarascan state.

For 1989–90 he was a scholar-in-residence of Pre-Columbian Studies at Dumbarton Oaks Research Library and Collection, with a research project entitled "Warfare and the Mesoamerican Past".

In 1997–98 Hassig spent a year as Resident Scholar under the Weatherhead Fellowship program at the School of American Research in Santa Fe, New Mexico, with a primary focus on researching the Aztec calendar.

In the 1999 United Kingdom academic year, Hassig was awarded one of the two residential Visiting Fellowships offered annually by the Sainsbury Research Unit at the Sainsbury Centre for Visual Arts, University of East Anglia, Norwich, towards the study of 'Aztec thought and culture'.
 
Hassig held a chair as Professor of Anthropology at the University of Oklahoma, until 2003 when he relocated to Tucson, Arizona. Since leaving OU Hassig has remained an independent scholar and author, continuing his research into Mesoamerican cultures and state societies.

Published works
Hassig's published works include:
authored books—
  
  
  
  
  
 
edited books—
 
contributed chapters—

Notes

References

External links
 

Aztec scholars
Historians of Mesoamerica
American Mesoamericanists
20th-century Mesoamericanists
21st-century Mesoamericanists
American anthropologists
Vanderbilt University alumni
Stanford University alumni
Columbia University faculty
University of Oklahoma faculty
Academics of the University of East Anglia
1945 births
Living people